Foodtown was a New Zealand supermarket chain owned by Progressive Enterprises. As with Woolworths, the Foodtown brand was phased out in the late 2000s, with all stores rebranded as Countdown by the end of 2011. Foodtown supermarkets were typically integrated with a shopping centre; the chain had few stand-alone stores.

History

1958–1961 Foodtown Supermarkets Limited 
On 18 June 1958, the first Foodtown supermarket of 1,400 square metres was opened on a 1.1-hectare site at Otahuhu. Three small business owners – Tom Ah Chee, Norman Kent, and John Brown – sold their small businesses and pooled their resources to personally build and supervise construction of New Zealand's first American-style supermarket. The Otahuhu supermarket proved a success and a second Foodtown was built and opened in Takanini, South Auckland in 1961.

1961–1988 Progressive Enterprises 
In 1961 the company was restructured when the Picot family joined the business. Their family company, Progressive Enterprises, contributed an equal amount of capital to that accumulated by the three original partners and became the parent company to Foodtown Supermarkets Limited.

1988–1992 Coles Myer Limited 
In March 1988 Progressive Enterprises became part of the Australian company Coles Myer. During this time it saw the expansion of the Foodtown chain to areas outside Auckland (Hamilton, Wellington, Tauranga, Palmerston North, Wanganui and New Plymouth) and also saw greater expansion within the wider Auckland area.

1992–1994 Progressive Enterprises – public company 
In April 1992 Coles Myer relaunched Progressive Enterprises onto the New Zealand stock exchange as a public company. During this time no new Foodtown supermarkets were opened.

1993–2005 Progressive Enterprises – Foodland Associated Limited 
In October 1993 Foodland Associated Limited (FAL) bought the majority shareholding from Coles Myer and shortly after bought all remaining public shares and delisted Progressive from the New Zealand stock exchange.  With this purchase Progressive Enterprises became the parent company for a number of FAL brands.  Progressive Enterprises consisted of: Foodtown Supermarkets, Countdown, 3 Guys, Georgie Pie Restaurant, Rattans and Supervalue.

On 17 June 2002 Progressive Enterprises Ltd bought Woolworths (NZ) Ltd from Hong Kong-based owners Dairy Farm Group. The sale saw Progressive's supermarket brands Foodtown, Countdown, 3 Guys, SuperValue and FreshChoice joined by Woolworths, Big Fresh and Price Chopper. As a result, PEL increased its share of the NZ grocery market to approximately 45%.

Foodtown was the first supermarket in New Zealand to launch a loyalty card called the "Foodtown Card", which offered exclusive discounts and competitions to cardholders. This was renamed in 2003 after the merger of Progressive and Woolworths (NZ) Ltd as the "Foodtown Woolworths onecard".

In 2004, there were 28 Foodtown stores.

2005–2011 Progressive Enterprises – Woolworths Limited 

On 24 November 2005 Australian company Woolworths Limited purchased Progressive Enterprises Limited from Foodland Associated Limited.

In October 2006, Progressive Enterprises announced a discount fuel scheme with Gull Petroleum and Shell to offer discounts on petrol when shoppers spent $40 or more in their Woolworths, Foodtown or Countdown Stores. This scheme was similar to the one their parent company Woolworths Limited offered in Australia.

In 2008, there were 33 Foodtown stores including 29 in Auckland.

In 2008, Progressive Enterprises announced their intention to phase out the Foodtown brand. Existing Foodtown locations were to be rebranded as Countdown over a 5-year period, as each store was to receive periodic upgrades. No existing Foodtown stores were to be closed as a result of this – although the store in Cameron Road, Tauranga, which was situated almost directly opposite a Countdown store, closed on 1 May 2011 due to "dwindling profits". In some areas, the location of a Foodtown near a Countdown resulted in two Countdowns close to each other, sometimes 100m. For example, a Countdown exists in the Manukau City Mall located at Westfield Manukau as well as in the stand-alone Manukau branch located on Great South Road. Another notable mention is the Countdowns in Highland Park, where there are Countdowns within 100m of each other. Another example is at Westfield Glenfield which has two Countdowns almost directly opposite each other, one of them being a converted Foodtown.

On 14 November 2011, the last Foodtown, at Browns Bay, was rebranded to Countdown, bringing an end to the iconic New Zealand brand.

Private label brands 
 Basics – replaced by Homebrand in 2005
 Signature Range
 Woolworths Select
 Woolworths Home Brand
 Woolworths Naytura
 Woolworths Freefrom
 Woolworths Essentials

See also
 Woolworths (New Zealand)
 Woolworths Supermarkets (Australia)
 Big Fresh
 Price Chopper

References

External links 

 Foodtown's Website

Supermarkets of New Zealand
Retail companies established in 1958
Retail companies disestablished in 2011
Woolworths Group (Australia)
2011 disestablishments in New Zealand
New Zealand companies established in 1958